Jaranwala is a city and capital of Jaranwala Tehsil located in the Faisalabad District of Punjab, Pakistan. It is the 58th largest city of Pakistan. It also one of the biggest tehsil by population in the province of Punjab in Pakistan.

Geography
It is located at 31°20'0N 73°26'0E with an altitude of 184 meters (606 feet). It is located 35 km southeast of Faisalabad and 110 km from Lahore. The city serves as the headquarters of Jaranwala Tehsil, an administrative subdivision of the district.

Etymology 
Jaranwala'a name originates from a Bohar, Bargad Banyan tree known as Jaranwala Bohar. Jaranwala is combination of two Punjabi words: Jaran and Wala, where Jaran means "roots" and "Wala" means place.

History
The city is almost 400 years old. According to legends, a Banyan tree with long hanging roots was positioned at the bank of a pond near Chak No. 240 GB. Because of that Banyan tree, the place was later to be known as Jaranwala. The word Jaranwala has two parts: Jaran and Wala. Jaran means roots and wala means place. Combining both words formed the name Jaranwala, meaning, place of roots.

The existing city was founded by the British government in 1908. Mr. Micheal Ferrar deputy commissioner of Faisalabad inaugurated this town in 1909 and Sir Ganga Ram designed the city.

Bhagat Singh, who was an influential figure in the Indian independence movement, was born in Chak 105 GB which is now part of Jaranwala. There is a 100-year-old gate, the Pakistani Gate, in front of Rail Bazaar in Jaranwala, which was later redesigned and rebuilt by the town municipality.

Pakistani Gate Jaranwala
The Pakistani Gate is a central point and historical monument in Jaranwala. In January 1917, Sardar Harbeel Sing notified the area committee of Jaranwala to construct a wooden gate to welcome the Lieutenant Governor of Punjab, Sir Michael Francis O'Dwyer, in Jaranwala. After his visit, the gate was named O'Dwyer Gate. However, after the Jallianwala Bagh massacre, the people demanded to rename the gate to no avail. Due to heavy wind, the name of O'Dwyer was removed from the gate and it was renamed the Railway Gate. On the visit of Nehru on 1 June 1936, it was renamed the Nehru Gate, and the president of Municipal Committee Jaranawala Lala Harnam Das approved the name the on 30 March 1937. The name was changed again after the independence of Pakistan, when the first president of the Municipal Committee of Jaranawala, Syed Altaf Hussain, renamed it the Pakistani Gate. The Pakistani Gate was reconstructed in 1956, 1967, and 2009.

Demographics
According to the 2017 Census of Pakistan, the population of the Jaranwala MC (Municipal Committee) is 150,380.

Education
Jaranwala has several schools:-

Government Post Graduate College Jaranwala
Govt Post Graduate College for Women Jaranwala
Government High School Jaranwala
Government Islamia High School Jaranwala
Govt Girls High School MC 1 Jaranwala
Govt Girls High School MC 2 Cinema Choke Jaranwala
Centre of Excellence Jaranwala                                                            
Punjab Group of Colleges Jaranwala Campus
Commerce College Jaranwala
Ripah College
Mian Nazir Hussain Model Secondary School
AW Grammar school
Al Raza Grammar school
Al-Ijaz high school Jaranwala
The Educators school system (city Campus or New City campus Jaranwala)
Allied School System
Dare Arqam School System
Virtual university campus
The Spirit school system campus
The Smart school system campus
Al-Noor Pre-Cadet School Jaranwala
Sir Syed College Jaranwala
Faran Public School Jaranwala.
The Educater's School system (Jaranwala city Campus or New City campus)
Allied School System
Informatics group of colleges Jaranwala
Pakistan Forces Academy-Major Mumtaz Shafique

Industry
The famous industrial area of Khurrianwala is part of the Jaranwala Tehsil. Other main industries include:
Rafhan Maize Products Plant
Crescent Jute Products Ltd Established in 1965, this was largest jute mill of Pakistan. It is currently out of business.
Aslam Textile Mills
Husein Sugar Mills
Lyallpur Chemicals & Fertilizers Limited, Jaranwala

Agriculture
Jaranwala has fertile land. It produces crops like rice, wheat, sugarcane, vegetables and fruits. Its grain market is one of the busiest markets in Punjab. It is also the biggest consumer of fertilizers by volume in Pakistan.

Transportation
There are daily bus services from and to Lahore and Faisalabad. There are many trains coming from Lahore on the Shorkot–Sheikhupura Branch Line.

Main roads 
There are seven main roads from Jaranwala to other cities.
Lahore-Jaranwala Road
Faisalabad-Jaranwala Road
Jaranwala-Nankana Road
Jaranwala-Satiana Road
Jaranwala-Shahkot Road
Jaranwala-Khurrianwala Road
Jaranwala-Syedwala Road

Notable people
Bhagat Singh, freedom fighter in British India
Sir Ganga Ram, Civil Engineer, a famous architect, who designed famous buildings like Lahore High Court, Aitchison College, Hailey College of Commerce, Lahore Museum, National College of Arts, and The Horse Train Ghangha Pur of British India 
Nand Lal, Subcontinental freedom fighter, politician and member of the Constituent Assembly of British India from East Punjab
Malik Nawab Sher Waseer, politician
Rai Haider Ali Khan, MPA politician
Rai Usman Khan, MPA politician
Munawar Shakeel - Famous Punjabi Poet

Gallery

See also
Jaranwala railway station

References

Cities and towns in Faisalabad District
Planned cities